Phyllocnistis saligna is a moth of the family Gracillariidae. It is known from almost all Europe (except Ireland and possibly also parts of the Balkan Peninsula), as well as India, Sri Lanka, La Réunion and South Africa.

The wingspan is about 7 mm. Adults are on wing in two generations, in July and from September to April.

The larvae feed on Salix alba, Salix babylonica, Salix daphnoides, Salix × fragilis, Salix lanata, Salix matsudana, Salix purpurea, Salix × sepulcralis, Salix triandra and Salix viminalis. They mine the leaves of their host plant. The mine consists of a long, epidermal corridor which is located on either the upper- or lower-surface. Mines are only found in terminal leaves of young shoots. The mine passes from one leaf to the other by way of the shoot epidermis. The frass is deposited in a broad central line. The corridor ends upon a leaf margin, where pupation takes place under a folded part of the margin, without an evident cocoon.

References

External links
Lepiforum.de

Phyllocnistis
Moths of Madagascar
Moths of Asia
Moths of Japan
Moths of Africa
Moths of Europe
Moths of Réunion